Each team's roster consists of at least 15 skaters (forwards, and defencemen) and 2 goaltenders, and at most 20 skaters and 3 goaltenders. All eight participating nations, through the confirmation of their respective national associations, had to submit a roster by the first IIHF directorate.

Group A

Canada
The roster was announced on 27 February 2017.

Head coach: Laura Schuler

Finland
The roster was announced on 14 March 2017.

Head coach: Pasi Mustonen

Russia
A 26-player roster was announced on 14 March 2017. The final roster was revealed on 25 March 2017.

Head coach: Mikhail Chekanov / Alexei Chistyakov

United States
The roster was announced on 8 March 2017.

Head coach: Robb Stauber

Group B

Czech Republic
The roster was announced on 19 March 2017.

Head coach: Jiří Vozák

Germany
The roster was announced on 24 March 2017.

Head coach: Benjamin Hinterstocker

Sweden
The roster was announced on 23 March 2017.

Head coach: Leif Boork

Switzerland
The roster was announced on 2 March 2017.

Head coach: Daniela Diaz

References

External links
Official website

rosters
IIHF Women's World Championship rosters